Portrait of Mathilde de Canisy, marquise d'Antin is a 1738 oil on canvas portrait by Jean-Marc Nattier, produced ten years before he became official painter to the French royal family. It is now in the musée Jacquemart-André in Paris. Interestingly, although this painting is now one of the most popular works in the Jacquemart-André Collection, no attention was paid to it at the time and it barely attracted any comments when it was first presented at the 1738 Salon.

It shows its subject Marie-François-Renée (known as Mathilde) de Carbonnel-Canisy (1725-1796) aged 14, the only daughter of René-Anne de Carbonnel, comte de Canisy (1683-1728). She had been orphaned aged three, raised by her paternal grandmother Charlotte de La Paluelle, and married to Antoine François de Pardaillan de Gondrin, marquis d'Antin aged twelve. It is an excellent example of Nattier’s work and sense of composition. The inversely curving arms form a diagonal with the garland of flowers arranged in a sling that crosses over the bust. Nattier rendered the drapery and silks to great effect, introducing delicacy, elegance, and sense of lightness to a genre that was traditionally majestic—the court portrait.

References

1738 paintings
Canisy
18th-century portraits
Canisy
Paintings in the collection of the Musée Jacquemart-André